Mount Wilson is an unincorporated community on the border of South Annville Township and South Londonderry Township in Lebanon County, Pennsylvania, United States. Mount Wilson is located along Pennsylvania Route 241.

References

Unincorporated communities in Lebanon County, Pennsylvania
Unincorporated communities in Pennsylvania